Domfront en Poiraie (literally Domfront in Pear Orchard) is a commune in the department of Orne, northwestern France. The municipality was established on 1 January 2016 by merger of the former communes of Domfront (the seat), La Haute-Chapelle and Rouellé.

See also 
Communes of the Orne department

References 

Communes of Orne
Populated places established in 2016
2016 establishments in France